Chapter five refers to a fifth chapter, but the term may also refer to:

Albums
Chapter 5: Letter, a 2002 album by g.o.d.
Chapter 5: Underrated, a Syleena Johnson album, 2011
Chapter V (Staind album), 2005
Chapter V (Trey Songz album), 2012
Chapter V: Unbent, Unbowed, Unbroken, a HammerFall album, 2005

Television
"Chapter 5" (American Horror Story), a 2016 episode of American Horror Story
"Chapter 5" (House of Cards), a 2013 episode of House of Cards
 "Chapter 5: The Gunslinger", an episode of the first season of The Mandalorian